Hypodoxa deteriorata is a moth of the family Geometridae first described by Francis Walker in 1860. It is found in Australia, including New South Wales and Victoria.

References

Moths described in 1860
Pseudoterpnini